Fábio Noronha de Oliveira (born 12 October 1975) is a Brazilian footballer who plays goalkeeper for América (Teófilo Otoni) .

He is also known as Oliveira in Hong Kong and just Fábio Noronha inside Brazil.

Biography

Turkey
Fábio Noronha left for Turkish side Ankaraspor in 2004 and signed a 4-year contract. After playing only five Turkish Super League matches, he terminated his contract with the club in January 2005, in part due to breaking his leg.

Return to Brazil
In January 2006 he signed a contract with América (RJ). He was the first choice keeper for the team at the 2006 Campeonato Brasileiro Série C first match. However, he lost his place to Adriano in the 2nd and 3rd match. Fábio Noronha started the 4th to 5th match of the return leg but again lost his place both in first choice and on the bench in the 6th match (on the bench was Wagner). The club finished as the bottom of Group 11, failing to reach the 2nd stage.

In 2007, he signed a contract with Atlético (GO) for 2007 Campeonato Goiano and 2007 Copa do Brasil. With Fábio M. Oliveira on the front, the team won the state league. In May 2007 he left for ABC to play at 2007 Campeonato Brasileiro Série C. He was the backup keeper for Raniere.

In August 2007 he returned to América (RJ) and signed a 1-year contract. He was the understudy of Donizeti and competed for the bench position with Tarso.

Hong Kong
In October 2007 he left for Hong Kong First Division side Happy Valley, as understudy of Fan Chun Yip. He also was selected by Hong Kong League XI for the 2008 Guangdong–Hong Kong Cup. In 2008, he left for TSW Pegasus but after a big mistake, he lost his starting place to Li Jian. Fábio Noronha remained with Pegasus until mid-2009.

Second return to Brazil
In June 2009, Noronha returned to Brazil and trained at América (RJ). However, he failed to agree the personal terms with club and left on 1 July.

In January 2010 he left América de Teófilo Otoni for 2010 Campeonato Mineiro. On 31 March 2010 he joined Goytacaz for the remaining Campeonato Carioca Série B match. Goytacaz entered the second stage and finished as the bottom (the 6th). After the season, he signed a contract with Confiança for 2010 Campeonato Brasileiro Série D. He missed the opening league matches, but started the remaining 5 matches.

In December 2010 he re-joined América (Teófilo Otoni).

International career
He capped for Brazil at the 1993 FIFA World Youth Championship, and the 1995 edition.

Honours
Campeonato Goiano: 2007

Individual
Toulon Tournament Best Goalkeeper (2): 1995, 1996

References

External links
Fábio Noronha at HKFA
Profile at flamengo.com.br/flapedia/ 

1975 births
Living people
Footballers from Rio de Janeiro (city)
Brazilian footballers
Brazil under-20 international footballers
Brazilian expatriate footballers
Brazilian expatriate sportspeople in Turkey
Expatriate footballers in Turkey
Expatriate footballers in Hong Kong
Association football goalkeepers
CR Flamengo footballers
Fluminense FC players
Ankaraspor footballers
Brazilian expatriate sportspeople in Hong Kong
America Football Club (RJ) players
Süper Lig players
Happy Valley AA players
Hong Kong First Division League players
São Raimundo Esporte Clube footballers
Hong Kong League XI representative players